Felix Becker (8 November 1893, Arensdorf, East Prussia – 29 December 1979, Göttingen, Lower Saxony) was a German officer of the Second World War. His final rank was oberst and he commanded Grenadier-Regiment 418, part of 281st Security Division. He was awarded the Iron Cross 2nd Class, Iron Cross 1st Class and on 25 January 1943 the Knight's Cross of the Iron Cross. From March 1945 until the end of the war, he commanded the 561st Volksgrenadier Division.

References

Bibliography
 Fellgiebel W.P., Elite of the Third Reich, The recipients of the Knight's Cross of the Iron Cross 1939-1945: A Reference, Helion & Company Limited, Solihull, 2003, 
 
  Scherzer, Veit (2007). Ritterkreuzträger 1939 - 1945 Die Inhaber des Ritterkreuzes des Eisernen Kreuzes 1939 von Heer, Luftwaffe, Kriegsmarine, Waffen-SS, Volkssturm sowie mit Deutschland verbündeter Streitkräfte nach den Unterlagen des Bundesarchives. Jena, Germany: Scherzers Militaer-Verlag. 

1893 births
1979 deaths
Recipients of the Iron Cross (1939), 1st class
Recipients of the Iron Cross (1939), 2nd class
Recipients of the Knight's Cross of the Iron Cross
German Army officers of World War II
People from East Prussia